Three agreements, each known as a Treaty of Hopewell, were signed between representatives of the Congress of the United States and the Cherokee, Choctaw, and Chickasaw peoples,. They were negotiated and signed at the Hopewell plantation in South Carolina over 45 days during the winter of 1785–86.

Hopewell plantation
The treaties were signed at the plantation owned by General Andrew Pickens, which the treaty texts refer to as “Hopewell on the Keowee.” Anthropologist James Mooney records that, "It was situated on the northern edge of the present Anderson county, on the east side of Keowee River, opposite and a short distance below the entrance of Little River, and about three miles from the present Pendleton. In the sight of it, on the opposite side of Keowee, was the old Cherokee town of Seneca, destroyed by the Americans in 1776."

Cherokee treaty

On November 28, 1785, the first Treaty of Hopewell was signed between the U.S. representative Benjamin Hawkins and the Cherokee Indians. The treaty laid out a western boundary for American settlement. The treaty gave rise to the sardonic Cherokee phrase of talking leaves since they claimed that when the treaties no longer suited the Americans, they would blow away like talking leaves. A description of the boundary is found in Article 4 of the accord: 

Included in the signatures of the Cherokee delegation were several from leaders of the Chickamauga (Lower Cherokee), including two from the town of Chickamauga itself and one from Lookout Mountain Town. The Cherokee complained at the treaty that some 3,000 white settlers of the de facto State of Franklin were already squatting on the Cherokee side of the agreed line, between the Holston and French Broad Rivers, and they continued to dispute that region until a new border was defined by the 1791 Treaty of Holston.

Cherokee treaty terms 
The preamble begins with,

The following lists the terms of the treaty:

1. Indians to restore prisoners (who are U.S. citizens or their allies), slaves, and property. 
2. The United States to restore prisoners to the Indians. 
3. Cherokees acknowledge the protection provided by the United States. 
4. Boundaries defined. 
5. No citizen of the United States shall settle on Indian lands and Indians may punish violators as they, please. 
6. Indians to deliver criminals who commit robbery, murder, or capital crimes. 
7. Citizens of the United States committing crimes against Indians to be punished. 
8. Retaliation restrained. 
9. United States to regulate trade. 
10. Special provision for trade. 
11. Cherokees are to give notice of any known designs against the United States by tribes or any person. 
12. Indians may send a "deputy," i.e., representative, to Congress. 
13. Peace and friendship are perpetual.

Congressional deputy 
Article XII states "That the Indians […] shall have the right to send a deputy of their choice, whenever they think fit, to Congress." In 2019, Cherokee Nation principal chief Chuck Hoskin Jr. cited a provision of the 1835 Treaty of New Echota that states that the Cherokee "shall be entitled to a delegate in the House of Representatives of the United States whenever Congress shall make provision for the same," in announcing that he intended to appoint, for the first time, a Congressional delegate from the Cherokee Nation. Pending a decision of the Cherokee National Council, Hoskin said he would nominate Kimberly Teehee, a member of the Cherokee Nation who formerly served as a policy advisor in the administration of President Barack Obama, to the post.

Choctaw treaty

The US–Choctaw Treaty of Hopewell was signed by the Choctaw at the foothills of the Smoky Mountains on January 3, 1786. The ceded area amounted to 69,120 acres, and the compensation to the Choctaw took the form of protection by the United States. To elaborate, the plenipotentiaries were Benjamin Hawkins, Andrew Pickens and Joseph Martin representing the U.S. while representing the Choctaw were 13 small medals and 12 medal and gorget captains.

Choctaw treaty terms 
The preamble begins with,

The following lists the terms of the treaty:

1. Indians to restore prisoners (who are U.S. citizens or their allies), slaves, and property. 
2. Choctaws acknowledge the protection provided by the United States. 
3. Boundaries defined. 
4. No citizen of the United States shall settle on Indian lands and Indians may punish violators as they, please. 
5. Indians to deliver criminals who commit robbery, murder, or capital crimes. 
6. Citizens of the United States committing crimes against Indians to be punished. 
7. Retaliation restrained. 
8. United States to regulate trade. 
9. Special provision for trade. 
10. Choctaws to give notice of any known designs against the United States by tribes or any person. 
11. Peace and friendship are perpetual.

Chickasaw treaty

On January 10, 1786, the Treaty of Hopewell was signed between U.S. representatives Benjamin Hawkins, Andrew Pickens, and Joseph Martin and the Chickasaw leaders Taski Etoka, Piomingo, and Lotapaia.

Chickasaw treaty terms 
The preamble begins with,

The following lists the terms of the treaty:

1. Indians to restore prisoners, slaves, and property.  
2. Acknowledge the protection of the United States.  
3. Boundaries defined.  
4. No citizen of the United States shall settle on Indian lands and Chickasaws may punish them as they please.  
5. Indians to deliver up criminals.  
6. Citizens of the United States committing crimes against Indians to be punished.  
7. Retaliation restrained.  
8. United States to regulate trade.  
9. Special provision for trade  
10. Indians to give notice of any known designs against the United States.  
11. Peace and friendship are perpetual.

See also
 List of Choctaw Treaties
 List of treaties
 Treaty of Holston

References

External links
 
 Indian Affairs: Laws and Treaties (Text of the 1786 Choctaw Treaty) 
 
 Indian Affairs: Laws and Treaties (Text of the 1786 Choctaw Treaty)
 
 Treaty of Hopewell Profile and Videos - Chickasaw.TV

United States and Native American treaties
Cherokee and United States treaties
Pickens County, South Carolina
Hopewell
Hopewell
Hopewell
Hopewell
1785 in the United States
1786 in the United States
Chickasaw
Choctaw